The Wheat Pool was a Canadian dark country rock band formed in 2004 in Edmonton. The band was on Shameless Records Canada.  The band played their final show on March 23, 2012, at the Pawnshop.

Discography

Albums
Township (2007)
Hauntario (2009)
Behind The Stars EP (2010)

References

External links
The Wheat Pool Web Site
Shameless Records Canada Web Site

Canadian country rock groups